Greg Siegele was the co-founder of   Ratbag Games Pty Ltd, an Australian video game developer of such games as Powerslide, The Dukes of Hazzard: Return of the General Lee and World of Outlaws: Sprint Cars 2002.

Greg developed his love for computers, and particularly programming and playing computer games, while attending South Australian private school Prince Alfred College. Although he left school with visions of becoming a top lawyer, after spending a couple of years practicing as a lawyer he decided he liked video games better.

Ratbag Games was founded in 1993 in Adelaide, South Australia by friends Greg Siegele and Richard Harrison. Initially known as Emergent Games, the company took 3 years to finish a prototype for their first title Powerslide. Following its acquisition by Midway Games on 4 August 2005 the company was known as Midway Studios Australia. Employees at the studio were told on 13 December 2005 that it was going to be closed by its parent company, and subsequently was two days later on the 15th, leaving the staff employed there without a job.

See also
 Ratbag Games
 Prince Alfred College

Notes

External links
 ABC Australia Stateline Transcript: Greg Siegele
 High Gear Article - Dirt Track Racing (DTR): Greg Siegele and Jay Weston
 Moby Games Main Summary: Greg Siegele
 The Ratbag Story So Far
 The Week Ratbag Would Like to Forget
 SEC Info - Midway Games Inc - 424B3 - On 9/14/05

People educated at Prince Alfred College
Year of birth missing (living people)
Living people